Gabriella Willems (born 1 July 1997) is a Belgian judoka. 

She is the silver medallist of the 2020 Judo Grand Slam Düsseldorf in the -70 kg category.

References

External links
 
 

1997 births
Living people
Belgian female judoka
European Games competitors for Belgium
Judoka at the 2019 European Games
21st-century Belgian women